Regina Mundi Catholic College (RMC) is a Catholic secondary school in London, Ontario, Canada, administered by the London District Catholic School Board. It is the second Catholic secondary school to be built and administered in London. RMC'S facility consists of a 50-acre property which had previously been used as a Junior Seminary and a provincially run residential school for native childrenSource?.

History

Regina Mundi, or "Queen of the World", began as a Junior Seminary. The building was commissioned in 1963, by Bishop John Cody, to be an institution for training of candidates entering diocesan priesthood. The schedule was extremely strict. The day began at 6:45am for Mass, breakfast at 7:40, Rosary in the chapel at 8:40. The students then went to class for the rest of the day. Study Hall took place from 7:00pm–9:00pm, and lights off were at 9:45pm.

In 1967 the school was renamed from Regina Mundi Seminary to Regina Mundi College.  It began to cater to boys from all over the world. Young men came from all over Canada, the United States, South & Central America, and Europe to attend.

In 1983 the Catholic education interest in London began to grow. At the time, Catholic Central was the only secondary school for Catholic Education. The school became Co-Ed, and a new wing was added on featuring a gymnasium and science laboratories. This was a complete reformation for RMC because for the first time, girls and boys were mixed and receiving education together in a building that for a long time was only for young men. The school eventually became a day school for boys and girls, and in 1987 the boarding school aspect left the building forever.

In 1988, RMC went under major reconstruction. A double gymnasium was added to the north end, at the end of the science wing, and the ARMO hall was renovated into the technology wing at the south end of the building. Five portable classrooms were placed outside, but a fire caused one of them to be removed in the late 1990s. The dorm rooms on the 2nd and 3rd floors were converted into classrooms, and the library was moved to the 2nd floor.

Location
RMC is located on the southern outskirts of London, on Wellington Road. City buses operated by London Transit do not approach the school, so all students are collected via school bus, or are driven by parents or themselves. The location has been a problem for extracurricular activities after school hours, because of the need for a late bus, which has had a costly effect on the school and the board.

The Catholic Education Centre, headquarters for the London District Catholic School Board, is located next door, to the north.

Facilities and grounds
RMC is situated on 50 acres of land, bounded by Wellington Road to the west, the London District Catholic School Board to the north, a pond and forest to the east, and Scotland Drive about 500 metres to the south.

The four-level Main Building, Three self-contained portables, two which are used by the CEC and one of which being the dance studio, a track and football field with field house, and a soccer pitch make up the entire secondary school campus.

The school has a great deal of parking, surrounding the entire Main Building. School buses will wrap around the building when picking students up.

In addition to having internet access from each classroom, the library resource center catalogs are available online to the students. Three classrooms are dedicated to learning services for students with learning disabilities.

In 2015, the school board was granted $19.2 million to replace Regina Mundi College.  As of January 2021, there has been no work to replace the school.

Main building
The Main Building of RMC was built in sections as needs for more size increased over the years. The original building was erected in 1963, and the double gym was added in 1988. Not much is known for the other additions, they were either part of the original construction of the building, or added on in 1967, when it became a boys boarding school. Compared to many other secondary schools in the London area, RMC has a very simple, linear layout.

Central (original) section
The Central Section of the Main Building is the original area of the school. This section has four levels (three above ground, one basement). The bell tower which used to be in front of the school stood directly over the main entrance, which led into this central section.

Ground Floor
The ground floor holds the cafeteria (below the chapel), and the majority of the arts classrooms (music room, visual arts rooms, drama room). The drama room features a connection to the backstage area of the Single Gymnasium above. Classrooms for hospitality and tourism (foods) are located nearby to the cafeteria, as well as for family studies. The lower portion of the Staff Lounge is in this area as well. To the south, a ramp provides access to the main level of the Technology Wing. Student council's office is down here, as well as the football change rooms, Charge custodian office and Lower Conference room.

First floor
In the Central Section, the first floor holds the Administration Offices (Principal, Vice Principals, Security, Attendance, and Guidance), the upper portion of the Staff Lounge, the chapel (above the Cafeteria), offices for the school Social Worker and Chaplain, offices for Co-Operative Education, The upper Conference Room, and a small number of classrooms which are most often used for religion, and some social sciences like economics, civics and history. To the south, a ramp provides access to the upper level of the Technology Wing. It is important to note the Central Section of the First Floor is raised above ground on the basement foundation, so there is not an accessible entrance in the Central Section.

Second floor
The second floor is mostly classrooms. For the most part, these classrooms are used for computer studies, French and other languages, and other social sciences such as law, business, and geography. There is also a media room for music classes, including a recording studio. The room offers a connection to a small balcony overlooking the chapel, likely where choral performances could take place. The Business Office, Student Services Office, and A/V Storage are located on the second floor. There is also some computer labs on this floor.

The library is located on the north end of the second floor, directly above the Single Gymnasium corridor. Part of the library (the media rooms and conference rooms) were part of the original addition. When the school became a high school in 1988, it was added on to, and turned into a library. Since the library was put on part of the original school, two support columns were added, which are in the single gym rotunda. Included in the library is a large reading and studying space, a small computer lab for use on lunches or spare periods, and two multi-purpose rooms which can be used for presentations or meetings.

Third floor
The third floor has a smaller number of classrooms, as there are a few offices - the Moderns Office, Social Sciences Office, and Math Office. In addition to the visual art classroom in the basement, there was also one on the third floor which has since been converted into two classrooms. The other classrooms are often used for math, social science and co-operative studies.

Single gymnasium corridor and science wing
This wing was either part of the original school, or added on in the late 1960s. This was the wing where most of the classes took place before the school was fully renovated into a co-ed day school.

Single gym
The Single Gymnasium acts both as a gym and as an auditorium. A stage is located to one side of the gym. In the backstage area, there is a connection to the drama room below. Storage rooms are located in the corridor just outside the gym. In the corridor as well, is a glass-encased foyer which holds vending machines and payphones. This foyer also exits out to the rear of the school and football field/track. Outside the foyer is also an entrance to a stairwell leading to the basement.

Science wing
The Science Wing is a single hallway with classrooms along each side. All science classes are held in the science wing. Also in the Science Wing is an accessible entrance, as the Science Wing is level to the ground. The Sciences Office is also located here.

Double gymnasium corridor
The Double Gymnasium was added in 1988 along with the new library. The double gym is wider than the single gym but both are the same length and it has a retractable wall which can separate it into two halves. It also features bleachers which can be folded manually when not in use. The Physical Education Offices are located just outside the Double Gym. The school's change rooms are located outside the Double Gym, there is also change rooms in the basement, which were the original changerooms before the double gym was added on. There is also a weight room on the mezzanine of the double gym. The weight room was previously located in the storage room across the music/drama rooms, and the double gym had bleachers on the second floor. There is also a green house room on the second floor.

Weight room
A weight room is located on a mezzanine level overlooking the Double Gym. It has a vast number of free-weights, weight machines, and other exercise equipment, which are used in physical education classes. Extracurricular weight training is also available. The weight room was originally located across the music and drama rooms, right beside the original changerooms.

Technology wing
The Technology Wing is located on the southern portion of the Main Building. Because the Central Section of the building is on a raised foundation to the basement, and the Technology Wing is built level to the ground, there are ramps connecting the basement and first floors of the Central Section to the first and second floors of the Technology Wing, respectively. The tech wing was part of the original building. It used to be the ARMO Hall (Association of Regina Mundi Old Boys), thus there was previously dorms in that wing. There was also a hallway on the top floor of the tech wing (in the storage/office or T104), which was shut off and converted into part of T104. The tech was also added on in 1988, when the school underwent the major renos.

The Technology Wing holds all technology classes, including computer design/information technology, manufacturing/wood-shop, automobile/transportation technology, and architecture/construction.

Portables
At one point, at RMCs peak student population (between 1988 and 2000), there were four portable complexes and a double portable for dance on site. Besides the remaining three portables, there was one portapak located to the east of the English portable, and another one in the back courtyard of the building.

Dance portable
The Dance Portable is located next to an exit leading from the music room, and has a ramp (for accessibility) leading to the entrance. It is used for the RMC Dance Program and for the RMC Dance Company practices. This portable may be replaced in the future with a new addition.

English portable
The English Portable is located behind the Dance Portable, where the majority of English classes are held, along with the English office. It is now closed and used for storage. The English classes were moved inside in 2013.

Religion portable
The Religion Portable is located next to the English Portable. It is, however, no longer used for Religion classes. Religion has since been moved to the first floor of the Main Building, where languages previously were studied. The Religion Portable is now used by the Catholic Board of Education.

Sewage plant
The sewage plant was closed down in 2009 and converted to a Maintenance grounds keeping facility. The school was converted from well water to municipal water in 2010.

Chapel

The chapel at Regina Mundi is located on the first floor of the Central Section, and is visible as soon as one walks into the main entrance of the building.  The chapel is the largest of all Catholic Secondary Schools in the LDCSB, owing to the history of the school as a Junior Seminary.

The chapel is built of stone on the exterior, as is the rest of the school, and has a wood finish inside. The altar is made of granite stone. Along the entire chapel are stained glass windows, and images featuring the Stations of the Cross. To either side of the cross are long fabric drapes displaying the school's colors of blue and gold. Behind those drapes are the pipes for the school's $200,000 organ.

There are two rooms on either side of the rear of the chapel. When the school was first built the two rooms behind the chapel were used by the priests as living quarters, but now they are the headquarters for the school's active Chaplaincy Team.

The chapel also features the Memory Wall, which has pictures of all the students and staff who have died during their terms at RMC.

Bell tower

For 47 years, the school featured a large bell tower in the front of the school which displayed a cross, which was illuminated nightly. A piece of the tower fell off in November 2010 and the tower had to be taken down for safety concerns. By March 1, 2011, the tower had been completely dismantled, and the cross was replaced atop the roof of the Central Section of the Main Building.

Feeder schools

 Holy Rosary Catholic School
 Sir Arthur Carty Catholic School
 St. David's Catholic School
 St. Francis Catholic School
 St. Sebastian Catholic School
 St. Anthony Catholic French Immersion School

Notable alumni
Jennifer Hedger, TSN announcer
Jason Williams, NHL player
Jason de Vos, Soccer player
Steve Patterson, comedian
Ingrid Kavelaars, actress
Monique Kavelaars, Fencer and Olympian
Brandon Prust, NHL player
Kiefer Sutherland, actor (24, The Lost Boys, Stand by Me); one semester only; not an alumnus
Sarah Lafleur, actress
Barrie Moore, NHL player
David Brown, CFL player

See also
List of high schools in Ontario

External links
 Regina Mundi Catholic College
 London District Catholic School Board

High schools in London, Ontario
Catholic secondary schools in Ontario
Buildings and structures in London, Ontario
Educational institutions established in 1963
1963 establishments in Ontario